Haumea is the goddess of fertility and childbirth in Hawaiian mythology. She is the mother of many important deities, such as Pele, Kāne Milohai, Kāmohoaliʻi, Nāmaka, Kapo, and Hiʻiaka. Haumea is one of the most important Hawaiian gods, and her worship is among the oldest on the Hawaiian islands. She was finally killed by Kaulu.

Mythology 
With the help of a magic stick called the Makalei, Haumea repeatedly transforms herself from an old woman to a young girl, and returns to her homeland periodically to marry one of her offspring, thus giving birth to continuous generations of humans. Eventually, her identity is found out, which angers her, causing her to leave humanity behind.

Haumea is said to have given humans the ability to give birth naturally. In a story, she visited Muleiula, the daughter of a chieftain who was experiencing painful childbirth, during which she discovered that humans only gave birth by cutting open the mother. Seeing this, Haumea created a potion out of the Kani-ka-wi tree (Spondias dulcis), which allowed the mother to push out the baby naturally.

Relationships 
Haumea is the sister of the gods Kāne and Kanaloa, and sometimes also the wife of Kanaloa. Some traditions identify Haumea with Papahānaumoku, the goddess of the Earth, and wife of the sky god Wākea.

Offspring
With Kanaloa, Haumea gave birth to the war god Kekaua-kahi, the volcano goddess Pele, as well as Pele's brothers and sisters, including Hi'iaka. Except for Pele, who was born the normal way, her children were born from various parts of her body. From her head, for example, were born Laumiha, Kahaʻula, Kahakauakoko, and Kauakahi.

Kumulipo 
According to the Kumulipo, a Hawaiian creation chant, Haumea's offspring are:
Children by Mulinaha: 
Laumiha
Kahaʻula
Kahakauakoko

Children by Kanaloa:
Kauakahi

Grandchildren:
Kauahulihonua
Haloa
Waia
Hinanalo
Nanakahili
Wailoa
Kiʻo (last born)

Legacy

On September 17, 2008, the International Astronomical Union named the fifth known dwarf planet in the Solar System Haumea. The planet's two moons were named after Haumea's daughters: Hiʻiaka, the goddess born from the mouth of Haumea, and Namaka, the water spirit born from Haumea's body.

See also

 Haumia-tiketike
 Papahānaumoku

Footnotes

References

External links
 Sacred texts

Hawaiian goddesses
Fertility goddesses
Haumea (dwarf planet)